Nong Suea is a district (amphoe) in the eastern part of Pathum Thani province, central Thailand. 

In the district area there is a pond, which in the past was visited by tigers from the mountains of neighboring Saraburi and Nakhon Nayok to drink water. So the people in the district named the pond Nong Suea.

Geography
Neighboring districts are (from the north clockwise): Wang Noi of Phra Nakhon Si Ayutthaya province; Nong Khae and Wihan Daeng of Saraburi province; Ban Na and Ongkharak of Nakhon Nayok province;  and Thanyaburi and Khlong Luang of Pathum Thani Province.

Administration
The district is divided into seven subdistricts (tambons), which are further subdivided into 70 villages (mubans). Nong Suea itself has township status (thesaban tambon) and covers part of tambon Nong Suea. There are seven Tambon Administrative Organizations (TAO).

Nong Suea